SLIT-ROBO Rho GTPase-activating protein 3 is an enzyme that in humans is encoded by the SRGAP3 gene.

References

Further reading